Tony DeCarlo (July 12, 1940 – April 18, 2018) was an American football and collegiate wrestling coach. He served as the head football coach at John Carroll University from 1987 to 1998, compiling a record of 90–27–4.

Head coaching record

Football

References

1940 births
2018 deaths
John Carroll Blue Streaks athletic directors
John Carroll Blue Streaks football coaches
Kent State Golden Flashes football players
College wrestling coaches in the United States
People from Painesville, Ohio
Players of American football from Ohio